Donald R. Buse (born August 10, 1950) is a retired American professional basketball player. A 6'4" (1.93 m) point guard from the University of Evansville, Buse played 13 seasons (1972–1985) in the American Basketball Association (ABA) and National Basketball Association (NBA) as a member of the Indiana Pacers, the Phoenix Suns, the Portland Trail Blazers, and the Kansas City Kings.

High school
Named an Indiana All-Star in 1968, following a stellar career at Holland High School, which consolidated with Huntingburg High School to become Southridge High School.
He started from 1964 to 1968, and led the Dutchmen to Sectional Championships in 1967 and 1968.
They finished the 1968 season undefeated but lost the Regional Championship game to perennial power Jeffersonville High School. Buse was selected to the Indiana All-Star Team in 1968.

College

 Played for legendary Arad McCutchan at Evansville College; leading the Purple Aces to a four-year record of 68–42 and the 1971 NCAA Men's Division II Basketball Championship title.
 Ranks # 13 all-time in scoring (1,426 pts.)
 Ranks # 9 all-time in scoring average (16.9)
 Ranks # 9 all-time in field goal percentage (.497)
 Ranks # 7 all-time in free throws (364)
 Ranks # 7 all-time in free throw percentage (78.5)
 Selected as 1st Team All-Indiana Collegiate Conference in 1970–71 and 1971–72.
 Selected as 1st Team All-District College Division (NABC) in 1972.
 Selected as 3rd Team All-American College Division (UPI) in 1972.
 Selected as 3rd Team All-American College Division (NABC) in 1972.
 Selected as Honorable Mention All-American College Division (AP) in 1972.
 Selected as 1st Team All-American College Division (Universal Sports) in 1972.
 Retired his number (#10)
 Selected to the USA Basketball Team in 1971; Pan-American Games participant.
 Invited to U.S. Olympic Trials in 1972; declined invitation for professional basketball career.

Career
Don Buse was selected for the NCAA squad to compete for positions on the 1972 U.S. Olympic basketball team, but he was replaced by Jim Forbes as he signed a professional contract.

Buse went on to play professionally for the Indiana Pacers, the Phoenix Suns, the Portland Trail Blazers, and the Kansas City Kings.

Buse was known for his dependable ball-handling, tight defense, and clutch-shooting, and he appeared in two All-Star games (one in the ABA in 1976; one in the NBA in 1977) during the course of his career.  His best season occurred in 1975–76, when he led the ABA in both steals per game (4.12) and assists per game (8.2) while also contributing a career high 12.5 points per game.  In the next season, his first in the NBA, Buse again led all players in steals per game (3.47) and assists per game (8.5).

In 1979, Buse helped take the Suns deep into the playoffs on a team with notable players, such as Paul Westphal, Walter Davis, Truck Robinson and Alvan Adams.

Buse was an All-Defensive Team member six times, from the 1974–75 season through the 1979–80 season. The first two were in the ABA and the final four were in the NBA.

After Buse's career he was selected to several All-time teams, including:
 Selected to the Indiana Basketball Hall of Fame 'Silver Anniversary' Team in 1993.
 Selected to the Indiana Basketball Hall of Fame in 1998.
 Selected as one of Indiana's Greatest 50 players  in 1999.
 Selected to the All-Time University of Evansville Basketball Team in 2005.

See also

 List of National Basketball Association annual assists leaders
 List of National Basketball Association annual steals leaders

References

External links

"No Boo-boos For Boo Boo", 1977 Sports Illustrated article
"Buse Putting Go in Pacers", 1982 Sporting News article
Indiana Basketball Hall of Fame 

1950 births
Living people
American men's basketball players
Basketball players at the 1971 Pan American Games
Basketball players from Indiana
Evansville Purple Aces men's basketball players
Indiana Pacers players
Kansas City Kings players
National Basketball Association All-Stars
Pan American Games competitors for the United States
Phoenix Suns draft picks
Phoenix Suns players
People from Huntingburg, Indiana
Point guards
Portland Trail Blazers players